Novation Digital Music Systems Ltd. is a British musical equipment manufacturer, founded in 1992 by Ian Jannaway and Mark Thompson as Novation Electronic Music Systems. Today the company specializes in MIDI controllers with and without keyboards, both analog and virtual analog performance synthesizers, grid-based performance controllers, and audio interfaces. At present, Novation products are primarily manufactured in China.

History

Novation's first commercial product, released in 1992, was the Novation MM10, a portable battery-operated keyboard controller with full-sized keys, designed to operate with the Yamaha QY10 music workstation. It was based on a device called the MidiCon, which was never released and was the first hardware controller the company made. The MM10 combined with the QY10 arguably constituted the first completely portable modern music workstation.

In 1993 the company released the Novation Bass Station. Influenced by the Roland TB-303 Bassline, a portable compact synthesiser designed for instrumental accompaniment, the Bass Station used digitally controlled analogue oscillators (DCOs), an LFO, and a filter to replicate the sound of a traditional monophonic twin-oscillator analogue synth.

The core technology of Analogue Sound Modelling (ASM) was introduced in 1995 with the Drum Station, which modelled the Roland TR-808 and TR-909 drum machines using digitally synthesised models of the original waveforms.

Novation's first technical director was Chris Huggett, who designed the Wasp and OSCar synthesisers and wrote the operating system for the Akai S1000.  While working for Akai, he gave Novation's founders advice and support, contributing to the design of the Bass Station and Drum Station – the former featured both the filter and amplifier Huggett had designed for the EDP Wasp – and joining full-time in the mid-1990s to design the Novation Supernova. He has been a consultant to the company ever since and has been involved in the design of many of the company's products.

Supernova, released in 1998, was a 3U rack-mounted polyphonic synthesiser with 16+ note polyphony and multitimbral operation, an important feature being the provision of multiple effects units which could be assigned to each timbre, allowing a much richer sound than had generally been possible with a multitimbral synthesiser. Supernova and its successor, SuperNova II, have been used by a wide range of artists including Orbital, ATB, The Faint, Sin, Jean Michel Jarre and A Guy Called Gerald.

Having produced controllers since the beginning and synthesisers from the early days, the company added USB-based computer audio interfaces and in 2004 produced the X-Station, intended to provide a complete music production environment with the addition of a computer/sequencer, microphone and monitoring. This was followed by MIDI controllers featuring no keyboard at all, but instead offering varying numbers of buttons, pads, control knobs and sliders, all sending MIDI messages. With the introduction of the SL range in 2005, this was complemented by Novation Automap, a software system that automatically detects and maps the controllable parameters of a plug-in or software application and configures the control surface to address them. Automap has continued to be developed to the present day and is available in a number of formats including an iOS app.

In August 2004, Novation was acquired by Focusrite Ltd. and became a subsidiary named Novation Digital Music Systems Ltd.

A keyboardless MIDI controller, the Novation Launchpad, was launched in 2009 with an 8x8 grid of large illuminated buttons that could be used to trigger sounds, loops, effects and other parameters, initially in conjunction with the Ableton Live music performance application. Launchpad was one of the first grid-based performance controllers and this area expanded over the subsequent period to become a significant aspect of the electronic music hardware market. There are currently 3 variations of the product, the Launchpad, Launchpad Pro, and Launchpad Mini. The Launchpad was out of the top two best Novation makings.

The company expanded into DJ controllers initially with the Novation Dicer in 2010, which consisted of two sets of buttons designed to be attached to a turntable or laptop, and then a full-blown DJ controller in 2011 with Novation Twitch, which differed significantly from then available devices of the type in that it used twin touch-strip controllers instead of the more common turntable emulation, providing additional control capabilities. The product has been discontinued since.

All these different areas of synthesis and control have increasingly combined in Novation products to create hybrid instruments and devices such as keyboard controllers with miniature grid launchers and on board synth and vocoder capability, for example the Ultranova (2011) and Mininova (2012).

Novation synthesisers have been used by a range of electronic acts including drum and bass/Rock group Pendulum, French composer Jean Michel Jarre, Steve Hillier of Dubstar and British group Orbital.

In the track "Triumph" by the rap group Wu-Tang Clan, Novation is referenced by Wu-Tang member RZA.

Key products

This section lists past and present key Novation products in chronological order with brief descriptions.
See also 21 Years of inNovation Novation official web site article.MM10 (1992) was a battery-powered portable keyboard system for the Yamaha QY10 music workstation. Later updated as the MM10-X.

BassStation (1993: aka BassStation Keyboard) included a pair of digitally controlled analogue oscillators (DCOs) with square, pulse and sawtooth waveforms, plus an LFO with random, triangle and sawtooth waveforms, and replicated the sound of a monophonic twin-oscillator analogue synth for bass and lead lines and synth effects plus MIDI controller data.

BassStation Rack (1994) included dual ADSR envelope shapers, 12/24db per octave filter, oscillator sync, and LFO, DCOs and built-in MIDI/Control Voltage (CV) converter. Users include William Orbit, Biosphere, Massive Attack, Orbital, Apollo 440, Nine Inch Nails, Radiohead, Jimi Tenor, Laurent Garnier, ATB, Sneaker Pimps, Out of Logic and Underworld.

DrumStation (1995) used 'Analogue Sound Modelling' (ASM), DrumStation included all the sounds of the TR808 and its successor the TR909, and the same tone controls for each sound, including tone, attack, decay, tuning, 'snappiness' and distortion (depending on the sound). 

Super BassStation (1997) added an arpeggiator, noise source, ring modulator, an additional LFO bringing the complement to two, a sub-oscillator (an octave below Oscillator 1), analogue chorus and distortion effects, keyboard filter tracking, stereo outputs and panning, enhanced memory, analogue trigger signal output and more to the original design.

Supernova (1998) Polyphonic synth providing a complete multi-effects processor for each of its eight audio output parts – and a total of 56 programmable effects available on all voices all the time. Supernova originally featured 16-note polyphony, later expanded to 20 with a new operating system, and three DCOs with ASM to recreate the classic analogue synth sound. A comprehensive filter provided low-, high- and bandpass filtering with 12, 18 and 24 dB/octave, with resonance and self-oscillation, plus overdrive and key tracking, where the filter tuning could follow the keyboard. Two powerful LFOs and two ring modulators completed the sound modification capabilities and the Supernova specification was rounded out with eight analogue outputs and full MIDI implementation. Supernova and its successor, Supernova II, have been used by Orbital, ATB, The Faint, Sin, Jean-Michel Jarre and A Guy Called Gerald.

Nova (1999) essentially repackaged the Supernova into a desktop performance module based around the same synthesiser engine.

Supernova II (2000) was available in 24, 36 and 48-voice models with additional 12 or 24-voice expansion boards. Available again in a 3U rack-mount format, the Supernova II was also available in a 61-note performance keyboard version with velocity and aftertouch, enabling sound tweaking during live performance. FM synthesis capability was included along with ring modulation, dual analogue inputs and a 42-band vocoder. An 8-part arpeggiator was also on board and in its full version the product offered 8-part multitimbrality and 48-voice polyphony, with 57 and 2304 oscillators running simultaneously.

A-Station (2001) was a cross between the BassStation and the Supernova. With voice architecture was based on the Supernova, A-Station added 8-voice polyphony and a basic FM synthesis engine, reverb and delay, plus a 12-voice vocoder for processing external sounds – which can also be used as an oscillator source and processed via filter and envelopes. An arpeggiator was also provided.

K-Station (2002) was a 2-octave keyboard version of the A-Station with 8-voice polyphony, three ASM oscillators providing a range of waveforms plus FM synthesis and a noise source, a 12-band vocoder, arpeggiator, dual ADSR envelope shapers and two LFOs, reverb and delay effects.

KS Series (2002) – KS4, KS5 and KS Rack – used enhanced versions of the K-Station engine with a range of additional features. The KS4 was a 4-octave keyboard, while the KS5 offered five octaves. Keyboards are semi-weighted and include aftertouch, and all 33 control knobs on the ergonomic control section send MIDI. The KS Series included four-part multitimbral operation with multiple assignable audio outputs, a 14 band vocoder and a separate effects processor for each part.

ReMOTE 25 MIDI controller keyboard (2003) was conceived in 2003 to bring back "hands on" tweaking to the computer musician. In addition to the ReMOTE 25, which was MIDI based, the ReMOTE 25 Audio provided the same facilities with the addition of a built-in USB audio interface and later developed into the X-Station. The ReMOTE keyboards were originally developed as controllers for  Propellerhead Reason''.

V-Station and B-Station (2003). These software products, still available as of January 2017, provide virtual emulations of the K-Station and Bass Station respectively. Both are available for Macintosh and Windows platforms, in both VST and AU formats.

X-Station (2004) was designed to create a complete music-making environment by adding a computer/sequencer, microphone and monitoring. Supernova class 8-voice ASM-based synth engine, template-based ReMOTE style MIDI control and a 2-in, 2-out stereo audio interface and multi effects engine plus semi-weighted aftertouch keyboard.

ReMOTE Zero SL (2006) was an addition to Novation's MIDI and USB controller range – most of which feature keyboards – with no (zero) keys. What the Remote Zero SL did offer was an enormous selection of knobs, buttons, sliders and trigger pads that could all be freely assigned to virtually any hardware device or application that supports MIDI. At the heart of the Remote SL range was Automap, which detects the sequencer in use and the software plugin instruments used in the project. It then intelligently and logically maps the software's controls to the controller's host of rotary controls, slider and push buttons.

Nio 2|4 (2007) was a multi-platform compact 2-in, 4-out USB audio interface aimed at musicians in general and guitarists in particular, bundled with a specially selected complement of 20 software effects in the Nio FX Rack application, controlled from the unit's front panel, which resembled a guitar effects pedal.

XioSynth (2007) was a keyboard synthesiser with USB audio interface and template-based MIDI controller, available in 25- or 49-key versions. Like the X-Station, it featured Novation's X/Y touchpad (the 'X-Pad') and included a synth engine based on that in the X-Station with the addition of filter overdrive and the X-Gator patch programmer, which can be configured to gate each patch to create 16-32-step rhythmic patterns synchronised to MIDI clock.

Nocturn (2008) takes the Automap technology from the Remote SL range and applied it to a compact controller. Utilising the automation frameworks used by various plugin architectures such as VST, Audio Units and RTAS, Nocturn downloads a list of controllable settings provided by a plug-in and assigns them to its combination of knobs and buttons. Eight touch-sensitive rotary shaft encoder controls with a ring of LEDs around each to indicate its setting; touch-sensitive crossfader; and a Speed Dial knob allowing patch selection and the ability to control any on-screen parameter.

The SL ReMOTE range was updated (2008–2009) to SL ReMOTE Mk II to include touch-sensitive knobs and sliders and Automap technology. SL MkII controllers were available with 25, 49 and 61 note velocity/aftertouch keyboards. Included eight rotary shaft encoders. Version with no keyboard was named ZeRO SL Mk II.

Launchpad (2009) is a multi-button controller for the popular live control application Ableton Live, featuring a grid of 64 (8x8) brightly illuminated square buttons. Each button can be assigned to a Clip – a piece of audio or MIDI that may or may not be looped. Additional modes allow Automap control of features and mixer control.

Nocturn 25 and 49 (2009) were essentially the Nocturn rotary encoder-based controller with the addition of a 25- or 49-note velocity/aftertouch keyboard.

Automap for iPhone and iPod Touch (2009) is an app providing basic remote control of DAWs, effects, sequencers or plug-in parameters using two faders and eight buttons on an iOS device.

Dicer (2010) consists of a pair of hardware button sets – five large operational buttons and three mode select buttons – designed to attach to the corners of a turntable or laptop and allow users of DJ applications such as Traktor and Serato the ability to control loops, cues and effects.

UltraNova (2010) is a 'Nova' series USB bus-powered single-part analogue-modelling synthesizer with an effects processor based on the Supernova II synth engine plus wavetable synthesis, enhanced filters, a software editor and a new touch-sense performance mode. Up to 18 voices, 14 filter types, 36 wavetables, and 5 effect slots, 37 full-sized keys and aftertouch, a 12-band vocoder and 2-in 4-out USB interface.

Twitch (2011) is a DJ controller with touchstrips instead of turntable emulators to navigate tracks, slice up beats and mix them back together on the fly. Includes a built-in audio interface. Originally developed in collaboration with Serato.

Impulse (2011) is a range of professional USB/MIDI controllers combining a 25-, 49- or 61-note precision semi-weighted aftertouch keyboard with a control surface providing DAW control including mixer, transport and plug-in instruments and effects powered by Automap control software. Impulse also has 8 back-lit performance pads that can trigger drums, effects, and launch Live clips.

MiniNova (2012) is a micro synth with 37-note keyboard based around the same synth engine as the UltraNova, capable of creating and editing sounds with up to 18 voices and effects. The VocalTune function can recreate iconic urban and hip hop vocal sounds, as well as classic house and techno voice effects with the onboard vocoder. MiniNova is a live synthesiser allowing sounds to be tweaked and modified in realtime. A range of free soundpacks created by eminent artists and sound designers including Chuckie, Ultimate Patches and more are available for download.

Launchkey (2013) is a range of 25, 37, 49 and 61 note keyboard controllers with up to 50 physical controls including 16 velocity-sensitive multi-colour launch pads that trigger clips and launch scenes in Ableton Live. As well as enabling hands-on control of a DAW mixer, instruments and more, Launchkey is an integrated software/hardware instrument with two apps for iPad: the Launchkey app and the Launchpad app, plus the V-Station & Bass Station synth plug-ins for Mac and Windows.

Launchkey app includes 60 synth sounds that can be changed instantly using interactive graphics. The Launchpad app is an app for iPad that makes it possible to create beats and music using an extensive selection of high quality loops and sounds can be combined in the multicolour 8x6 Launchpad grid. Eight volume sliders allow quick volume changes and FX modes offer DJ effects such as beat-repeaters and synced filter effects.

Launchpad S (2013) is an updated and brighter version original LaunchPad with faster flicker, response rate and brighter buttons.

Bass Station II (2013) is a re-working of the original concept with two filters, three oscillators, patch save and a fully analogue effects section and signal path. It includes a step-mode sequencer, arpeggiator, a dual octave (25-note) velocity-sensitive keyboard with full-sized keys, and a comprehensive modulation section. There's also full MIDI I/O and USB connectivity. AFX Mode, added with firmware v4.14 allows for modification of patches on a key-by-key basis. A variety of free & paid sounds by Ultimate Patches are available for download.

Launchpad Pro, Launchpad MkII, Launchpad Mini, and Launchpad Mini MkII (2015) are other updated versions of the Launchpad. Launchpad Pro and Launchpad MkII introduce a new RGB feature, Launchpad Pro has velocity and aftertouch sensitivity, 16 more side buttons, and standalone external MIDI I/O mode. As well as a setup mode

Circuit (2015) is a multi-part groovebox sequencer, featuring two synth engines (derived from the MiniNova) and a four part sample based drum machine. It consists of a 4x8 sequencer/note grid, 8 knobs and is battery-powered.

Peak (2017) is a digital / analogue hybrid synthesizer with a unique oscillator architecture designed by Chris Huggett, based on FPGA technology. The Peak has eight voices of polyphony: three FPGA oscillators per voice plus an independent noise source. While the oscillators are digital, the filter is analog, as are the distortion circuits (consisting of pre- and post-filter overdrive and a separate overdrive affecting the composite output).

Circuit MonoStation (2017) is an Analogue Paraphonic Synthesizer in the Circuit family. It uses a similar 4x8 grid but has more control knobs for specific parameters of the synth engine. Its two oscillators can be sequenced together or used paraphonically (a variation on Duophony, where each oscillators pitch can be played separately, but uses only one master amp envelope).

Launchpad X (2019) is an updated version the launchpad Mk2 line-up, featuring 16 squared off edge buttons. the 64 main buttons which have become velocity and pressure sensitive. The Launchpad X also now has a setup mode just like the Launchpad Pro Mk2. And uses a USB-C Type Cable to connect. It comes with a Copy of Ableton Live 10.

Launchpad Pro Mk3, Launchpad Mini Mk3 (2020) After releasing the Launchpad X for the 10 year anniversary of Launchpad. Novation released the Launchpad Mini Mk3 as well as the Launchpad Pro Mk3. The Launchpad Mini Mk3 Has the same layout as the Launchpad X. Unlike previous versions of the Launchpad Mini. This one Has RGB Pads. The new Launchpad Pro Mk3, Has 32 Squared Off Edge Buttons. Both Devices Use USB-C Type Cables To Connect and both come with a license to Ableton Live 10 Lite.

References

Further reading

External links
 The official Novation website
 21 Years of inNovation Product history on the Novation official web site
 Vintage Synth Explorer, an online database, includes many instruments Novation has produced.

Companies based in Buckinghamshire
High Wycombe
Synthesizer manufacturing companies of the United Kingdom
Novation synthesizers
Electronics companies established in 1992
Musical instrument manufacturing companies of the United Kingdom
1992 establishments in England
British companies established in 1992